2009 is a collaborative studio album by American rappers Wiz Khalifa and Curren$y. It was released on February 8, 2019 via Jet Life Recordings and Atlantic Records. Production was handled by Cardo, Dame Grease, DJ Fresh, Harry Fraud, Monsta Beatz, Ricky P, Sledgren, Van Gogh and Z Cook. It features guest appearances from Problem and Ty Dolla $ign.

Reception

2009 was met with generally positive reviews from critics.

Commercial performance
In United States, 2009 debuted at number 35 on the Billboard 200 with 16,000 album-equivalent units.

Track listing

Charts

References

2019 albums
Currensy albums
Wiz Khalifa albums
Collaborative albums
Albums produced by Cardo
Albums produced by Dame Grease
Albums produced by Harry Fraud
Atlantic Records albums